San Jose Creek is an intermittent, tributary stream of the San Gabriel River in Los Angeles County, California. From Thompson Wash, San Jose Creek flows nearly  westwards from Pomona into the San Gabriel River through the Pomona Valley and San Gabriel Valley.

From 1829, San Jose Creek was a stopping place on the Old Spanish Trail first used by Antonio Armijo. In 1837, much of its upper reaches were enclosed within the Rancho San Jose.

References

Rivers of Los Angeles County, California
San Gabriel River (California)